The Western Australian Legislative Council is the upper house of the Parliament of Western Australia, a state of Australia. It is regarded as a house of review for legislation passed by the Legislative Assembly, the lower house. The two Houses of Parliament sit in Parliament House in the state capital, Perth.

Effective on 20 May 2005, for the election of members of the Legislative Council, the State was divided into 6 electoral regions by community of interest —3 metropolitan and 3 rural—each electing 6 members to the Legislative Council. The 2005 changes continued to maintain the previous malapportionment in favour of rural regions. Legislation was passed in 2021 to abolish these regions and increase the size of the council to 37 seats, all of which will be elected by the state-at-large. The changes will take effect in the 2025 state election.

Since 2008, the Legislative Council has had 36 members. Since the 2013 state election, both houses of Parliament have had fixed four-year terms, with elections being held every four years on the second Saturday in March, though the term of the Legislative Council not expiring until May after the election. In the current Legislative Council, elected at the 2021 election, Labor has majority control of the chamber—the first time any party gained the majority in the upper house since 1983.

Six members of the Legislative Council are elected from each of the six regions under a proportional and preferential voting system using the single transferable vote method. Each council region overlaps with a varying number of Assembly seats. Because of the proportional representation system in place as well as the malapportionment in favour of rural regions, the Legislative Council has traditionally been controlled by a coalition of the Liberal and National parties, and minor parties and independents have been more easily elected.

Current distribution of seats

The current composition of the Legislative Council, elected at the 2021 state election, is as follows:

 19 votes as a majority are required to pass legislation.

History
Western Australia's first representative parliament was the Legislative Council, first created in 1832 as an appointive body. Initially it consisted only of official members; that is, public officials whose office guaranteed them a place on the Council. Three years later, an attempt was made to expand the Council by including four unofficial members to be nominated by the governor. However, the public demand for elected rather than nominated members was so great that implementation of the change was delayed until 1838.

In 1850, the British Parliament passed an act that permitted the Australian colonies to establish legislative councils that were one-third nominated and two-thirds elected, but only under the condition that the colonies take responsibility for the costs of their own government. Because of this provision, Western Australia was slow to adopt the system. In 1867, the governor responded to public demand for representative government by holding unofficial elections and subsequently nominating each elected person to the Council. Three years later, representative government was officially adopted and the Legislative Council was changed to consist of 12 elected members and 6 members nominated by the governor. Suffrage was limited to landowners and those with a prescribed level of income.

When Western Australia gained responsible government in 1890, a bicameral system was adopted and the Legislative Council became a house of review for legislation passed by the popularly elected Legislative Assembly.  This Council consisted of 15 members, all nominated by the governor.  However, it was provided that once the population of the colony reached 60,000, the Legislative Council would become elective. The colony was expected to take many years to reach a population of 60,000 but the discovery of the eastern goldfields and the consequent gold rush caused that figure to be reached by 1893. The constitution was then amended to make the Legislative Council an elective house of 21 seats, with three members to be elected from each of seven provinces.  The first election to the Council was held following the dissolution of parliament in June 1894.

This system was retained until 1962 when, over the next two years, the Council was reformed, creating a series of two-member electorates. Members were elected for six years with provision for re-election of one every three years. Universal suffrage was also granted in order to bring the Council into line with the Assembly. This arrangement remained until 10 June 1987 when the Burke Labor government, with the conditional support of the National Party, introduced the present system of multi-member electorates and a method of proportional representation which is, however, 'weighted' to give extra representation to rural constituents. The legislation was made possible because the Australian Democrats in 1986 negotiated an election preference flow to Labor in return for an explicit undertaking on Legislative Council electoral reform, which resulted in the defeat of a number of Liberal councillors who were committed to opposing such reform.

Until 2005 the state used a zonally weighted electoral system for both houses of parliament.  In effect, this meant that the vote of a Perth voter counted for less than that of a rural voter. The difference was less marked in the Assembly than in the Legislative Council, whose metropolitan regions are numerically weighted so that up to two rural members are elected by the same number of votes needed to elect a single member from Perth. This style of weighting has not been adopted by any other Australian state.

While the Liberal Party and Labor Party were both advantaged and disadvantaged by this system, it strongly benefited the National Party. During the 1990s, Liberal Premier Richard Court considered changing the system along the lines of that in place in South Australia, but backed down in the face of National Party opposition.

Effective on 20 May 2005, for the election of members of the Legislative Council, the State was divided into 6 electoral regions by community of interest, 3 metropolitan and 3 rural, each electing 6 members to the Legislative Council. The regions were defined geographically and functionally, and also included partial requirements for equal numbers of Legislative Assembly districts. However, all previously elected members remained until the following election on 6 September 2008. Even with the reforms, rural areas are still significantly overrepresented. According to ABC election analyst Antony Green, the rural weighting is still significant enough that it is all but impossible for a Liberal premier in Western Australia to govern without National support, even if the Liberals win enough Legislative Assembly seats to theoretically allow them to govern alone.

Malapportionment
While Perth accounts for 70% of the state's population, only 30% of the state's population is located in towns and small settlements across an area of over 2.6 million square kilometres outside the Perth metropolitan area.

However, until 2005, the state used a zonally weighted electoral system for both houses of parliament. In Legislative Council elections, this meant a vote in Perth was worth around 47% of a rural vote.

The WA Legislative Council is the last remaining State or Territory chamber in Australia to have a significant rural overweighting.

For example, the Mining and Pastoral Region has 16% of the average number of electors in the three metropolitan regions, which on paper gives Mining and Pastoral voters six times the voting power of those in the city of Perth. However, according to Green, the actual bias is greater due to historically lower turnout in the Mining and Pastoral region.

Constituencies

1870–1890: Electoral districts
The Legislative Council Act 1870, which took effect the same year, created ten electoral districts for the Legislative Council, electing twelve members in total. Three later acts of parliament (in 1874, 1883, and 1887) established four more electoral districts, created from the territory of existing districts.

 Albany
 Fremantle (two members)
 Gascoyne (1883)
 Geraldton
 Greenough
 Kimberley (1887)
 Murray and Williams (1874)

 The North (1874; two members from 1883)
 Perth (two members)
 Swan
 Toodyay
 Vasse
 Wellington
 York

1894–1989: Electoral provinces
In 1890, following the creation of the Legislative Assembly, the Legislative Council returned to being a completely appointed body, with 15 members. The Constitution Act Amendment Act 1893 was subsequently passed, taking effect in 1894, to provide for seven electoral provinces, each electing three members. Additional provinces were created in 1897 and 1900, and a further reorganisation occurred in 1950 (following the passage of the Electoral Districts Act 1947 establishing an independent electoral commission).

 Central Province
 East Province (1894–1950)
 Metropolitan Province
 Metropolitan-Suburban Province (1900–1950)
 Midland Province (1950)
 North Province

 North-East Province (1897)
 South-East Province
 South Province (1900)
 South-West Province
 Suburban Province (1950)
 West Province

The Constitution Acts Amendment Act (No.2) 1963, effective from the 1965 state election, abolished the ten existing three-member provinces, replacing them with 15 two-member provinces. One new province was added at the 1977 state election. Some of the new provinces bore the same names as the previous provinces.

 Central Province
 East Metropolitan Province (1977)
 Lower Central Province
 Lower North Province
 Lower West Province
 Metropolitan Province
 North-East Metropolitan Province
 North-Central Metropolitan Province
 North Metropolitan Province

 North Province
 South-East Province
 South-East Metropolitan Province
 South Metropolitan Province
 South Province
 South-West Province
 Upper West Province
 West Province

1989–2025: Electoral regions

The Acts Amendment (Electoral Reform) Act 1987, which took effect at the 1989 state election, created six electoral regions to replace the previous electoral provinces. Initially, the South West and North Metropolitan regions each returned seven members, while the other regions each returned five. This arrangement was changed to have each region return six members for the 2008 state election.

 Agricultural
 East Metropolitan
 Mining and Pastoral

 North Metropolitan
 South Metropolitan
 South West

From 2025: State-wide electorate
After the 2021 state election, in which the Labor Party won a majority in both houses of parliament, the state government formed a commission to explore reform to the Legislative Council electoral system. The committee recommended the abolition of the six electoral regions in favour of a single state-wide electorate and the abolition of group voting tickets, among other changes. The Electoral Legislation Amendment (Electoral Equality) Bill 2021 was passed in November 2021 and established a "one vote, one value" system in the Legislative Council for the first time. The electoral regions were abolished and replaced by a single state-wide electorate of 37 members, while GVTs were replaced by optional preferential voting. The changes will take effect in the 2025 state election. Voters will be required to vote for one or more preferred parties above the dividing line on the ballot paper, or at least 20 candidates below the dividing line.

See also
2021 Western Australian state election
Members of the Western Australian Legislative Council
Parliaments of the Australian states and territories

Notes

References

Further reading

External links
 Australia's Upper Houses - ABC Rear Vision A podcast about the development of Australia's upper houses into STV proportional representation elected chambers.

 
Parliament of Western Australia